Kirk House is a historic home located at Narrowsburg in Sullivan County, New York, United States.  The original section was built in the 1840s as a one-story frame schoolhouse.  It was moved to its present site in 1875 and a second story was added the following year.  It measures , three bays in length and two bays wide.  It was coated with stucco in the 1920s.  It features a center entrance and foll width, one story porch with Italianate style detailing.

It was added to the National Register of Historic Places in 1984.

References

Houses on the National Register of Historic Places in New York (state)
Houses completed in 1876
Houses in Sullivan County, New York
National Register of Historic Places in Sullivan County, New York